Hayford Akrofi (January 1952 – 23 June 2014) was a Ghanaian political activist and architect.

Akrofi came from Akwapim Hills. He was educated at Ghana Senior High School. He was a member of the executive committee of the Convention People’s Party.

Death
Akrofi was murdered by a burglar on 23 June 2014.

References

2014 deaths
Ghanaian activists
Ghanaian architects
1952 births
Ghana Senior High School (Koforidua) alumni